The 1984–85 Football League season was Birmingham City Football Club's 82nd in the Football League and their 33rd in the Second Division, to which they were relegated in 1983–84. They finished in second position in the 22-team division, so were promoted back to the First Division after only one season. They entered the 1984–85 FA Cup in the third round proper, and lost to Norwich City in that round after three replays. They were eliminated from the League Cup by West Bromwich Albion in the third round after a replay.

Wayne Clarke was the club's top scorer, with 19 goals in all competitions, of which 17 were scored in the league.

The last home game of the season, a 1–0 win against Leeds United in front of a season-high crowd of nearly 25,000 that confirmed promotion back to the top flight, was marred by rioting in which 500 people were injured and a 15-year-old boy died when a wall collapsed. The match took place on the same day as the Bradford City stadium fire, and both formed part of the remit of Mr Justice Popplewell's inquiry into safety at sports grounds. According to his report, the events at St Andrew's "more resembled the battle of Agincourt than a football match".

Football League First Division

League table (part)

FA Cup

League Cup

Appearances and goals

Numbers in parentheses denote appearances as substitute.
Players with name struck through and marked  left the club during the playing season.
Players with names in italics and marked * were on loan from another club for the whole of their season with Birmingham.

See also
Birmingham City F.C. seasons

References
General
 
 
 Source for match dates, league positions and results: 
 Source for lineups, appearances, goalscorers and attendances: Matthews (2010), Complete Record, pp. 404–05.

Specific

Birmingham City F.C. seasons
Birmingham City